Time and Seasons, is an album by American contemporary gospel music group Commissioned, released on October 12, 1999 via Verity Records. New members, Marcus Cole and Chris Poole joined in this group.

Domestically, the album peaked at number 6 on the US Billboard Top Gospel albums chart, number 13 on the Billboard Top Contemporary Christian chart and number 28 on the Billboard Heatseekers chart.

Track listing 
 "Shama of God" (1:35)
 "Barach You" (4:37)
 "Glorious Praise" (4:10)
 "Testimony Service" (1:24)
 "Testify" (4:23)
 "You've Been Good" (4:50)
 "Trying of Your Faith" (4:34)
 "Psalms 84" (4:37)
 "Just Worship" (1:17)
 "Believe" (4:22)
 "One Love" (4:45)
 "Charge It to My Head" (4:17)
 "That Ain't No Commissioners" (1:19)
 "You Stayed With Me Lord" (2:09)
 "Thank You for Loving Me" (4:49)
 "Ordinary Just Won't Do" (4:54)
 "Clean Heart" (5:13)
 "You Are Forgiven" (4:55)
 "Walk Right" (4:02)

Personnel
Karl Reid: vocals
Marcus Cole: vocals, keyboard programming
Mitchell Jones: vocals, drum programming
Chris Poole: vocals

Additional Musicians
Rufus Troutman: talk box
Michael J. Mindingall & Communion: background vocals
Tim Bowman: guitar

References

Commissioned (gospel group) albums
1999 albums